Dunham Castle is an early medieval castle in Dunham Massey, Greater Manchester, England.

History
The castle is first referred to in 1173, in a document stating Hamo de Masci held the castles of Dunham and Ullerwood. Documentary evidence suggests the castle at Dunham was still standing in 1323. The castle fell into disuse between 1323 and 1362. It probably existed on a mound, or motte, near the site of where Dunham Massey Hall is today. The site was surrounded by a moat which was later turned into an ornamental lake. Dunham Castle has been confused with Watch Hill Castle in nearby Bowdon, but the two were separate castles, though both probably owned by de Masci. Dunham Castle was a Scheduled Ancient Monument, but was delisted.

See also
Castles in Greater Manchester

References

Castles in Cheshire
Buildings and structures in Trafford